Number 3 Squadron, also known as No. 3 (Fighter) Squadron, of the Royal Air Force operates the Eurofighter Typhoon FGR4 from RAF Coningsby, Lincolnshire, since reforming on 1 April 2006. It was first formed on 13 May 1912 as one of the first squadrons of the Royal Flying Corps – being the first to fly heavier than air aircraft.

History

Foundation and First World War
No. 3 Squadron, Royal Flying Corps, was formed at Larkhill on 13 May 1912 by the renaming of No. 2 (Aeroplane) Company of the Air Battalion Royal Engineers, under the command of Major Robert Brooke-Popham. Being already equipped with aeroplanes and manned by pilots and air mechanics, No. 2 (Aeroplane) Company was thus the first British, Empire or Commonwealth independent military unit to operate heavier-than-air flying machines, hence the 3 Squadron motto Tertius primus erit, meaning "The third shall be the first". On 5 July 1912, two members of the squadron, Captain Eustace Loraine and Staff Sergeant Wilson were killed in an aircraft crash, making them the first RFC fatalities. In 1913, No 3 Squadron deployed to Halton in Buckinghamshire to support the land manoeuvres of the Household Division. A temporary airfield was set up on what later became RAF Halton's Maitland Parade Square. During the exercise, No 3 Squadron flew a number of reconnaissance sorties and staged the first confrontation between an airship and an aeroplane.

As well as training and reconnaissance duties, the squadron spent much of its time carrying out experimental work and working out tactics, including how to direct artillery fire from the air. In late 1913, the squadron carried out trials in the use of machine guns from aircraft, which eventually resulted in the selection of the Lewis gun for use by the RFC and from early in 1914 carried out trials in airborne photography, helping to develop the cameras that would be used by the RFC in the First World War. Other trials included the first night flights carried by the RFC.
 
The squadron was sent to France on the outbreak of the Great War, arriving at Amiens on 13 August 1914, carrying out its first reconnaissance mission, piloted by Captain Philip Joubert de la Ferté on 19 August. The squadron initially operated primarily in the reconnaissance role using a variety of aircraft types. In December 1914, the squadron started to receive Morane-Saulnier L parasol-wing aircraft, and was almost solely equipped with the Morane Parasol by April 1915. It started to replace its Morane-Saulnier L with the improved Morane-Saulnier LA, which had ailerons instead of the wing warping of the earlier aircraft, in September 1915, and all its Parasols were Type LAs by December 1915. In 1916 it supplemented its Parasols with a flight of four Morane-Saulnier BB biplanes, and from the middle of 1916 replaced its Morane-Saulnier LAs with Morane-Saulnier P parasols.

The English ace James McCudden served as a mechanic and occasional observer with 3 Squadron in the early part of the war, leaving the squadron in January 1916 for flying training. Cecil Lewis, author of Sagittarius Rising joined the squadron in May 1915 and flew Morane Parasols with the squadron during the Somme offensive. Later in October 1917, with the introduction of Sopwith Camels, a fighter/scout role was taken on, with 59 enemy aircraft being claimed by the end of the war. The squadron disbanded on 27 October 1919.

There were nine flying aces among its ranks, including Douglas John Bell, George R. Riley, Will Hubbard, Adrian Franklyn, Hazel LeRoy Wallace, Lloyd Hamilton, David Hughes, Neil Smuts and William H Maxted.

Interwar
It reformed in India on 1 April 1920 as a fighter squadron equipped with Sopwith Snipes, being disbanded again 30 September 1921. It was immediately reformed the next day at RAF Leuchars, Scotland, as a naval observation squadron equipped with the Airco DH.9A, receiving the Westland Walrus and Avro Bison before being disbanded to form two independent flights on 1 April 1923.

It reformed as a fighter squadron with Snipes a year later on 1 April 1924, operating a succession of different types, based in the UK, including the Gloster Gladiator. The only highlight of these years was the 1935 deployment to the Sudan during the Italian invasion of Abyssinia.

Second World War

At the start of the Second World War No 3 Squadron was posted as part of Fighter Command to RAF Station Biggin Hill equipped with the Hawker Hurricane. It briefly deployed to France in support of the British Expeditionary Force following the German attack on the West in 1940, being forced to withdraw after 10 days, having claimed 60 German aircraft for the loss of 21 of its own. On 21 July 1940 "B" flight was detached to form the nucleus of the newly formed No. 232 Squadron. Once back up to strength, No. 3 Squadron was used as air defence for the Royal Naval base at Scapa Flow, remaining in Scotland until April? 1941, based at the RAF Station at Wick in Northern Scotland. In June 1941 No 3 Squadron moved from Martlesham Heath to RAF Stapleford Tawney operating four-cannon Hurricane IIs in 'Rhubarb' attacks on defended ground targets and shipping in northern France and Belgium.

The squadron then co-operated with "Turbinlite" searchlight equipped Douglas Havocs in the night fighter role.

In February 1943 it re-equipped with the Hawker Typhoon for fighter-bomber and anti-shipping strikes. It re-equipped in March 1944 with the new Hawker Tempest fighter, operating over the Normandy beach-head and against German V1 flying bombs, claiming 288 V-1s shot down.

It then deployed across the Channel, flying as part of the 2 TAF fighting through the low countries and into Germany. Amongst its pilots was F/L Pierre Clostermann, who flew with 3 Squadron from March 1945 until the end of the war in Europe.

Post-War
The squadron moved onto jets with the De Havilland Vampire during 1948, in Germany, where it had remained after moving there in the latter stages of the war. Sabres and Hunters replaced the Vampires during the 1950s, followed by Gloster Javelins and then a conversion onto Canberra bombers. Most of its time with Canberras was spent at RAF Geilenkirchen moving to RAF Laarbruch in January 1968.

No. 3 (Fighter) Squadron's association with the Hawker Siddeley Harrier began in the early 1970s with the Harrier GR1 at RAF Wildenrath where it reformed from Canberras to Harriers and they joined 4 & 20 Squadron equipped with Harrier GR1's who were already operational at RAF Wildenrath. The squadron received the later GR3 and GR5 model Harriers successively at RAF Gütersloh, finally receiving the GR7 and relocating to RAF Laarbruch in the 1992. In 1999, with the drawdown of the RAF in Germany, the squadron moved back to the UK along with its sister squadron No. IV (AC) Squadron. The two squadrons operated at RAF Cottesmore, being joined by the other Harrier operator, No. 1 (F) Squadron, in summer 2000.

As part of Joint Force Harrier, 3 Squadron operated alongside the Fleet Air Arm Sea Harriers, and was capable of deployment from the Royal Navy aircraft carriers. Operations included Operation Allied Force over Kosovo in 1999, Operation Palliser over Sierra Leone in 2000 and Operation Telic over Iraq in 2003. In August 2004, it was announced that 6 Harriers would be deployed to Afghanistan in support of NATO forces.

Eurofighter Typhoon (2006–present)

After the Harrier GR7s had been passed to the Fleet Air Arm to be used by the recommissioned No. 800 Naval Air Squadron, No. 3 Squadron moved to RAF Coningsby where it re-equipped with the Eurofighter Typhoon on 1 April 2006 and became the first operational front line RAF Typhoon squadron in July 2007. The squadron began to take over Quick Reaction Alert (QRA) responsibilities from the Panavia Tornado F.3 on 29 June 2007.

In March 2011, No. 3 (F) Squadron deployed to Southern Italy to take part in Operation Ellamy over Libya in support of UN Security Council Resolution 1973.

In May 2012, four aircraft were deployed to RAF Northolt in an air defence role covering the duration of the Olympic Games, the first time RAF fighters had been stationed at the base since the Second World War.

During March 2018, six Typhoons from No. 3 Squadron deployed to Andravida Air Base in Greece for Exercise Iniochos. It was the first time that RAF Typhoons had participated in the annual NATO exercise.

On 3 September 2019, No. 3 (F) Squadron deployed to Oman for two weeks to participate in Exercise Magic Carpet.

Aircraft operated

Sopwith Camel (September 1917 – February 1919)
Sopwith Snipe (April 1920 – October 1921; April 1924 – October 1925)
Airco DH.9A (October 1921 – October 1922)
Westland Walrus (January 1922 – April 1923)
Hawker Woodcock II (July 1925 – September 1928)
Gloster Gamecock I (August 1928 – July 1929)
Bristol Bulldog II (May 1929 – December 1932)
Bristol Bulldog IIA (February 1931 – January 1932; December 1932 – June 1937)
Gloster Gladiator I (March 1937 – March 1939; July 1938 – July 1939)
Hawker Hurricane I (March–July 1938; July 1939 – April 1941)
Hawker Hurricane IIA/IIB (April – November 1941)
Hawker Hurricane IIC (April 1941 – May 1943)
Hawker Typhoon IB (February 1943 – April 1944)
Hawker Tempest V (February 1944 – April 1948)
De Havilland Vampire F.1 (April 1948 – May 1949)
De Havilland Vampire FB.5 (May 1949 – May 1953)
North American Sabre F.1/F.4 (May 1953 – June 1956)
Hawker Hunter F.4 (May 1956 – June 1957)
Gloster Javelin FAW.4 (January 1959 – December 1960)
English Electric Canberra B(I).8 (January 1961 – January 1972)
Hawker Siddeley Harrier GR.1A/T.2 (January 1972 – March 1977)
Hawker Siddeley Harrier GR.3/T.4 (March 1977 – May 1989)
BAE Harrier GR.5/T.4 (May 1989 – February 1992)
BAE Harrier GR7/T10 (February 1992 – 31 March 2006)
BAE Harrier GR7A (2004 – 31 March 2006)
Eurofighter Typhoon F2 (1 April 2006 – July 2008)
Eurofighter Typhoon FGR4/T3 (3 June 2011 – present)

Battle honours
The battle honours awarded to No. 3 Squadron. Those marked with an asterisk (*) may be emblazoned on the squadron standard.

Western Front 1914–1918*
Mons*
Neuve Chapelle
Loos
Somme 1916
Cambrai
Somme 1918*
Hindenburg Line
France and Low Countries 1940*
Battle of Britain 1940*
Home Defence 1940–1945
Fortress Europe 1942–1944
Channel and North Sea 1943–1945
Normandy 1944*
Arnhem*
Rhine
France and Germany 1944–1945*
Iraq 2003*
Libya 2011

Commanders

See also
List of Royal Air Force aircraft squadrons
Keith Thiele

References

Notes

Bibliography

 
 
 
Jefford, C.G. RAF Squadrons, a Comprehensive Record of the Movement and Equipment of all RAF Squadrons and their Antecedents since 1912. Shrewsbury: Airlife Publishing, 2001. .
 
 
Long, Jack T.C. Three's Company: An Illustrated History of No. 3 (Fighter) Squadron RAF. Barnsley, South Yorkshire, UK: Pen & Sword Books Ltd., 2005. .
Moyes, Philip J.R. Bomber Squadrons of the RAF and their Aircraft. London: Macdonald and Jane's (Publishers) Ltd., 1964 (new edition 1976). .

 
Rawlings, John D.R. Fighter Squadrons of the RAF and their Aircraft. London: Macdonald and Jane's (Publishers) Ltd., 1969 (new edition 1976, reprinted 1978). .

External links

No. 3 Squadron on RAF website
3 (Fighter) Squadron Association

003 Squadron
No. 03
Military units and formations established in 1912
003 Squadron
1912 establishments in the United Kingdom